TheWrap is an American multiplatform media company covering the business of entertainment and media via digital, print, and live events. It was founded by journalist Sharon Waxman in 2009.

Awards
TheWrap has won awards for its journalism, including best website in 2018 for a news organization exclusive to the internet at the Los Angeles Press Club's SoCal Journalism Awards and best entertainment website in 2018 at the National Arts and Entertainment Journalism (NAEJ) awards. In 2016, the L.A. Press Club's NAEJ gave the site its top prizes for feature photography and Sharon Waxman's WaxWord blog, as well as second place for Best Entertainment Website and Entertainment Publication. The site was named the best online news site in both 2012 and 2009 by the same group.

In November 2019, TheWrap was nominated for the 12th annual Los Angeles Press Club's National Arts and Entertainment Journalism Awards, including best website.

References

External links
 
 
 
 

American blogs
Online magazines published in the United States
Entertainment trade magazines
Magazines established in 2009
Magazines published in California